The discography of Crystal Fighters, an English electronic band, consists of four studio albums, nine singles and ten music videos.

Crystal Fighters' debut album, Star of Love was released in October 2010 and produced a chain of well received singles. The release of their second album, Cave Rave, in May 2013, was preceded by one official single, two official videos, and the airing and/or online streaming of the first four tracks.

Studio albums

Singles

Music videos

Remixes and appearances

2009

80Kidz – This Is My Works
"I Love London" 
Annie Mac – Annie Mac Presents
"Xtatic Truth"
I Love London EP
"I Love London" 
"I Love London" 
"I Love London" 
"I Love London" 
"I Love London" 
"I Love London" 
"I Love London" 
Kitsuné Maison Compilation 7
"Xtatic Truth" 
Kitsuné Maison Compilation 8
"I Love London"
Kitsuné Remixes Album #2
"Xtatic Truth" 
Rob Da Bank – Bestival '09
"Xtatic Truth" 
Trax Sampler 130
"I Love London" 
"Xtatic Truth" (single)
"Xtatic Truth" 
"Xtatic Truth" 
"Xtatic Truth" 
"Xtatic Truth" 
Xtatic Truth Remixes EP2
"Xtatic Truth" 
"Xtatic Truth" 
"Xtatic Truth" 
"Xtatic Truth" 
"Xtatic Truth" 
Xtatic Truth" Remixes EP3
"Xtatic Truth" 
"Xtatic Truth" 
"Xtatic Truth" 
"Xtatic Truth" 
"Xtatic Truth" 
"Xtatic Truth" 
"Xtatic Truth"

2010

DJ P.O.L. Style – Мишка Presents Keep Watch Vol. XVIII
Crystal Fighters vs. DJ Pied Piper – "I Love London"  vs. "Do You Really Like It?"
Follow / Swallow EP1
"Follow" 
"Swallow" 
"Follow" 
"Follow" 
"Follow" 
"Follow" 
"Follow" 
Follow / Swallow EP2
"Swallow" 
"Swallow" 
"Swallow" 
"Swallow" 
"Follow" 
"Follow" 
"Follow" 
Gildas & Masaya – Tokyo
"I Love London" 
In The Summer EP1
"In The Summer" 
"In The Summer" 
"In The Summer" 
"In The Summer" 
"In The Summer" 
"In The Summer" 
In The Summer EP2
"In The Summer" 
"In The Summer" 
"In The Summer" 
"In The Summer" 
"In The Summer" 
In The Summer EP3
"In The Summer" 
"In The Summer" 
"In The Summer" 
"In The Summer" 
Kitsuné Remixes Album #3
"I Love London" 
Oneman – Rinse: 11
"I Love London" 
Plus Ultra – Autonomic Podcast Layer 12
"Follow" 
Sound Pellegrino Thermal Team – The Sound Pellegrino Podcast Episode 4
"Follow" 
Un Automne 2010
"Swallow"

2011

At Home EP
"At Home" 
"At Home" 
"At Home" 
"At Home" 
"At Home" 
"At Home" 
"At Home" 
"At Home" 
Día de la música 2011
"Fiesta de los maniquíes"
"Plage" (single)
"Plage" 
"Plage" 
Plage EP
"Plage" 
"Plage" 
"Plage" 
"Plage" 
"Plage" 
"Plage" 
Radio 538 - Hitzone 58
"Plage"
Sound Pellegrino Thermal Team – The Sound Pellegrino Podcast Episode 9
"At Home" 
Tsugi Bonus Digital : Tsugi 38
I Do This Everyday

Misc

"At Home" - 
"At Home" - 
"At Home" - 
"At Home" - 
"At Home" - 
"I Love London" 
"I Love London" 
"I Love London" 
"I Love London" 
"I Love London" 
"I Love London" 
"I Love London"

Remixes for other artists

 Master Shortie 'Dance Like A White Boy'
 The Wombats 'Jump into The Fog'
 CSS 'Let's Reggae All Night'
 Erik Hassle 'Don't Bring Flowers'
 Magic Wands 'Black Magic'
 MIT 'Rauch'
 Pony Pony Run Run 'Hey You'
 Two Door Cinema Club 'I Can Talk'
 Alex Winston 'Velvet Elvis'
 Vadoinmessico 'Teeo'

Mixtapes

 Feast of Aurora
 Pop Espanol (Rough Trade exclusive CD)
 Que Vasco Eres
 Online Mixtape
 Radio Mix for Kitsuné (Broadcast on Le Mouv)
 Kiss FM Minimix (Broadcast by Loose Cannons Kiss 100 FM)
 Online Mixtape
 Dreams of Disco Mixtape

References

Electronic music discographies
Discographies of British artists